Major General Arthur Thomas Moore,  (20 September 1830 – 25 April 1913) was a Bombay Army officer and an Irish recipient of the Victoria Cross, the highest award for gallantry in the face of the enemy that can be awarded to British and Commonwealth forces.

Details
Moore was born in Carlingford, County Louth and educated at the East India Company College. He was 26 years old, and a lieutenant in the 3rd Bombay Light Cavalry, Indian Army during the Persian War when the following deed took place for which he and John Grant Malcolmson were awarded the VC.

On 8 February 1857 at the Battle of Khushab, Persia, Lieutenant Moore who was Adjutant of the Regiment, was probably the first in the attack, but his horse, on leaping into the square, fell dead, crushing his rider and breaking his sword. Lieutenant Moore extricated himself, but he would almost certainly have lost his life had not Lieutenant John Grant Malcolmson fought his way to his dismounted comrade and carried him to safety. In this battle Lieutenant Moore also charged an infantry square of 500 Persians at the head of his regiment and jumped his horse over the enemy's bayonets.

He later achieved the rank of major general. He died 8 Waterloo Place, Dublin, 25 April 1913 and is buried in Mount Jerome Cemetery.

See also
 List of Persian War Victoria Cross recipients

References

External links

News Item "Arthur Moore's Victoria Cross sold at auction"

Irish recipients of the Victoria Cross
British Indian Army generals
British East India Company Army officers
People from Carlingford, County Louth
1830 births
1913 deaths
19th-century Irish people
Irish soldiers in the British East India Company Army
British military personnel of the Anglo-Persian War
Burials at Mount Jerome Cemetery and Crematorium
Companions of the Order of the Bath
Deaths from influenza
Infectious disease deaths in Ireland
Bombay Staff Corps officers